Frogham is a hamlet in the Dover District of East Kent, England, between Canterbury and Dover. It is located between the former coal mining village of Aylesham and Shepherdswell. It is near the site of the former Snowdown colliery. In published statistics, the population of the hamlet is included in the civil parish of Nonington.

External links
 

Villages in Kent
Dover District